Jake Keegan (born September 7, 1990) is an American professional soccer forward who currently plays for One Knoxville SC in USL League One.

Club career

Youth 
Keegan played 4 seasons at John Jay High School helping the team win the 2008 Class AA Section 1 Championship and advancing to the New York State Final Four.

Keegan played club soccer for the East Fishkill Thunder. The team was the most successful in club history winning the 2009 Eastern New York State Cup, Region 1 Championship and finishing 3rd at the USYS National Championships.

Keegan also won a Gold Medal at the 2008 Empire State Games as a member of the Hudson Valley.

College 
Keegan played 4 seasons of NCAA Division 1 soccer at Binghamton University. He became the schools all time leading Division 1 goal scorer and was drafted in the 2013 MLS Supplemental Draft by the Philadelphia Union of Major League Soccer.

PDL 
Keegan played for the Westchester Flames and Jersey Express for 3 seasons between 2011–2013.

Professional

FCA Darmstadt 
On September 1, 2013 Keegan signed with FCA Darmstadt in the Verbandsliga, the 6th division of German soccer. After being drafted by the Philadelphia Union in January 2013, Keegan trained with Maccabi Haifa (Israel), FC Lustenau (Austria), Harrisburg City Islanders (USA), New York Cosmos (USA), Austria Lustenau (Austria), FC Hard (Austria) and Usinger TSG (Germany) before signing in Darmstadt.

Galway United 
On January 29, 2014, Keegan signed with Galway FC in Ireland First Division, the 2nd division of Irish soccer. The club was newly formed as a result of Galway United going bankrupt in 2011. Keegan re-signed in 2015 after the club earned promotion to the Ireland Premier Division, the 1st division in Irish soccer. The club took the old name of Galway United back for the 2015 season.

FC Edmonton 
On December 1, 2015 Keegan signed with Canadian side, FC Edmonton who played in the NASL.

St Patrick’s Athletic 
On February 4, 2018, Keegan signed with St Patrick’s Athletic who play in the Ireland Premier Division, the 1st division in Ireland. Keegan finished up the season as Pats' top scorer with 9 league goals, 12 in all competitions.

Greenville Triumph 
On January 10, 2019 Keegan signed with Greenville Triumph SC who play in USL League One, the 3rd division in the United States.

Forward Madison 
On January 26, 2021, it was announced that Keegan had signed with Forward Madison FC of USL League One.

Return to Greenville Triumph 
After spending the 2021 season in Madison, Keegan returned to Greenville on December 21, 2021.

One Knoxville SC 
Keegan was announced as One Knoxville's third signing on December 13, 2022.

Career statistics

Honors 
Team
League of Ireland Promotion Playoff Winner: 2014
EA Sports Cup Finalist: 2015
Leinster Senior Cup Finalist: 2018
Europa League Qualification: 2018
USL League One Finalist: 2019
USL League One Champion: 2020

Individual
USL PDL Rookie of the Year: 2011
USL PDL Golden Boot: 2011
USL PDL All League: 2011
Galway United Player of the Year: 2015
USL League One Player of the Month: July 2020

References

External links 
 
 Binghamton University profile
 FC Edmonton profile

1991 births
Living people
American soccer players
Association football forwards
People from Dutchess County, New York
Sportspeople from the New York metropolitan area
Soccer players from New York (state)
Binghamton University alumni
Westchester Flames players
Jersey Express S.C. players
Galway United F.C. players
FC Edmonton players
St Patrick's Athletic F.C. players
Greenville Triumph SC players
Forward Madison FC players
USL League Two players
League of Ireland players
North American Soccer League players
Philadelphia Union draft picks
American expatriate soccer players in Germany
Expatriate association footballers in the Republic of Ireland
Expatriate soccer players in Canada
USL League One players
American expatriate sportspeople in Ireland
American expatriate sportspeople in Canada
American expatriate soccer players
Binghamton Bearcats men's soccer players
One Knoxville SC players